K2-3c also known as EPIC 201367065 c is an exoplanet orbiting K2-3 a red dwarf every 24 days. It is 144 ly away. It has a density of 1.82g/cm3, indicating that it could be a Gas dwarf or a mini-Neptune. It is one of the smallest gas planets ever discovered. Despite not being the smallest planet in the system by radius, by mass it is by far the least massive, with a mass only double that of Earth.

References

Exoplanets discovered in 2015
Transiting exoplanets
K2-3 system
3

Leo (constellation)